The Scorpio Illusion is a 1993 novel by Robert Ludlum. It is a mix of suspense, drama, action and thriller.

Plot summary

Tyrell Hawthorne was a naval intelligence officer - one of the best - until the rain-swept night in Amsterdam when his wife was murdered, an innocent victim. 
Now Hawthorne has been called out of retirement for one last assignment. For he is the only man alive who can track down the world's most dangerous terrorist. Amaya Bajaratt is beautiful, elusive, deadly - and she has set in motion a chilling conspiracy that a desperate government cannot stop. With the life of the president hanging in the balance, Hawthorne must follow Amaya's serpentine trail to uncover the sinister network that exists to help this consummate killer. And Hawthorne must discover the shattering truth behind the Scorpio Illusion.

Analysis
The novel "consciously draws on Freudian theory to lend depth to his treatment of the two dominant characters, a psychotic woman, driven by childhood traumas to emasculate dominant males and to destroy all symbols of male hierarchical power, and her opponent, a weakened, age-conscious male reaffirming his masculine strengths."

There is a factual error in the novel. Telephone conversations using scrambling are an important plot element in this novel.  However, from about half-way through one side of the call is on a normal telephone.  This is impossible; both phones must be equipped with compatible scrambler/descramblers.

Publication history

1993, UK, HarperCollins , Pub date April 8, 1993, Hardback
1993, UK, HarperCollins , Pub date November 1, 1993, Paperback
1993, US, Bantam , Pub date May 1, 1993, Hardback
1994, US, Bantam , Pub date January 1994, Paperback

References

1993 novels
Novels by Robert Ludlum
HarperCollins books